Liolaemus coeruleus, the blue tree iguana, is a species of lizard in the family  Liolaemidae. It is native to Argentina and Chile.

References

coeruleus
Reptiles described in 1983
Reptiles of Argentina
Reptiles of Chile
Taxa named by José Miguel Alfredo María Cei